The Birmingham Royal Institution for the Blind (BRIB) is a registered charity institute in the United Kingdom which oversees the work of three distinct charities in the Birmingham area:

 Focus Birmingham provides day-to-day services to the visually impaired and their care givers, including telephone help lines, rehabilitation services, social services, etc.
 Queen Alexandra College is a specialist, independent residential college for young people with disabilities; specialists in visual impairment and autism.
 New Outlook Housing provide accommodation facilities to the blind and visually impaired.

History
In 1846, founders Elizabeth Bache Harrold and Mary Badger rented a small home and opened it as a school for the blind, beginning with just six students.  Over the years, the organization grew in size and success, placing blind graduates in various positions which had previously been closed to the blind.  In 1848, the little school was officially named the "Birmingham Institution for the Blind".  In 1909, King Edward VII and Queen Alexandra visited the institution, and conferred their royal patronage.  At this time, the institution became formally known as "The Birmingham Royal Institution for the Blind".

In 1985, the Birmingham Royal Institution for the Blind was incorporated under the laws of Great Britain and assumed all financial and operational activities of the previously unincorporated charity.  In 1997, the operations of the Queen Alexandra College and Birmingham Focus on Blindness (later Focus Birmingham) were launched as independent charitable companies that still receive support from BRIB.

References

External links

Charities for disabled people based in the United Kingdom
Charities based in Birmingham, West Midlands